The 6th Corps was a corps of the Army of the Republic of Bosnia and Herzegovina.

History 
The 6th Corps of the Army of the Republic of Bosnia and Herzegovina was formed on 9 June 1993. Konjic became the headquarters of the 6th Corps. 6th Corps was formed from 4th Corps Northern Herzegovina Operational Group to occupy northern Herzegovina from the HVO and eventually reach the Adriatic coast. But it had little success and was disbanded in February 1994.

Some units were incorporated into the 7th Corps and the rest into the 4th Corps.

Commanders 
1st Commander: Salko Gušić

6th Corps Units 
7th Motorized Brigade
1st Commander: Asim Korićić
2nd Commander: Colonel Šerif Patković
43rd Mountain Brigade (Konjic)
44th Mountain Brigade 'Neretvica' (Jablanica)
1st Commander: Enes Kovačević
2nd Commander: Hasan Hakalović
45th Mountain Brigade 'Neretvica' (Jablanica)
304th Brigade
445th Light Infantry Brigade (Konjic)
450th Light Infantry Brigade (Bjelimići)
Neretva Brigade
Commander: Enes Kovačević
Operational Group East - Visoko
Vareš Brigade
Nemilu Brigade
Reconnaissance and Sabotage brigade 
Commander: Ibrahim Purić

Corps of the Army of the Republic of Bosnia and Herzegovina